Palabuhanratu  or Pelabuhan Ratu  (Sundanese for: 'Harbor of the Queen') is a district and fishing town which serves as the regency seat of Sukabumi Regency. It is at the southwest coast of Palabuhanratu Bay, West Java facing the Indian Ocean. It is a four-hour drive from Bandung and up to a 12-hour drive from Indonesia's capital Jakarta due to traffic jams in Ciawi, Cicurug, Cibadak and Pelabuhan Ratu gate, whose residents love to visit the bay 'Teluk Palabuhanratu', once named 'Wijnkoopersbaai' (wine merchant's bay) by the Dutch. The bay is shaped like a horseshoe and has enormous waves that can be very treacherous. The Sundanese locals say that the Indian Ocean is the home of Nyai Loro Kidul who reigns along the southern coast of Java.

Economy

Ocean fishing port
The current port has been improved to become an ocean fishing port with investment of Rp.415 billion ($48.8 million) on a 17-hectare area expansion. The project was initialized in September 2011.

Tourism

Coastline

The Pelabuhan Ratu's white sands beach is a popular vacation destination for visitors from Sukabumi, Bogor, Bandung and Jakarta. However, because of high rolling waves, some spots on the beach are considered too dangerous for swimming. Together with Pangandaran, the beaches are popular in West Java, both facing south towards the Indian Ocean.

Hotels, restaurants, resorts, and tourism facilities were built in the vicinity. Among the oldest is The Samudra Beach Hotel, established in 1966 commissioned by then Indonesian president Sukarno. Sukarno was involved with the exact location and the idea for the Samudra Beach Hotel. The hotel keeps room 308 furnished with green colours and reserved for Nyai Loro Kidul. A painting of Nyai Rara Kidul by Basuki Abdullah, a famous Indonesian painter, is displayed in this room.

Surfing location
Palabuhanratu has become a popular location for surfers in recent years, with its Indian Ocean location providing good waves. Several spots that are popular with for surfers are Cimaja Beach, Sunset Beach, Karang Sari Beach and Karang Aji Beach.

From June 12 to 18, 2011 the second event of the West Java Surfing Championship was initialized at Cimaja Beach: a 750-meter beach with waves about 1 to 2 meters high. The competition got 6 stars surfing premium (the highest rank) as a part of Indonesian Surfing Championship and Asian Surfing Championship Tours. Cimaja Beach has many rocks, so sometimes it is called 'Beach Without Sand.'

Climate
Palabuhanratu has a tropical rainforest climate (Af) with moderate rainfall from June to September and heavy to very heavy rainfall from October to May.

References

Fishing communities
Populated places in West Java
Regency seats of West Java
Sukabumi Regency
Tourist attractions in West Java